Eliseo Guallar is an American epidemiologist. He is a professor of epidemiology at the Johns Hopkins Bloomberg School of Public Health with a joint appointment at the Johns Hopkins University School of Medicine. His research focuses on cardiovascular diseases.

Early life and education
Guallar completed his medical degree at the University of Zaragoza in 1987 before travelling to North America for his Master's degree in the University of Minnesota with a Fulbright Scholarship. Following this, he enrolled at Harvard University for his DrPH in 1994.

Career
Upon completing his formal education, Guallar joined the faculty of Johns Hopkins Bloomberg School of Public Health as an assistant professor in epidemiology. In this role, he co-authored Mercury, Fish Oils and the Risk of Myocardial Infarction which advised eliminating fish with high mercury content from the human diet. Later that year, Guallar also published a study of 7,830 white and African American adults age 30 to 74 to prove that rising systolic blood pressure was the clearest indicator for increased risk of death compared to other blood pressure measurements. As a result of his research, Guallar was named a Fellow of the Center for Excellence in Environmental Public Health Tracking at the Johns Hopkins Bloomberg School of Public Health. During the 2012–13 academic year, Guallar was elected a Fellow of the American Heart Association and promoted to the rank of professor in the Department of Epidemiology.

In 2016, Guallar was recognized as a scientist who is among the top one percent in their fields for citations. During the COVID-19 pandemic, Guallar co-authored The Role of Masks in Mitigating the SARS-CoV-2 Pandemic: Another Piece of the Puzzle.

References

External links

Living people

Year of birth missing (living people)
American epidemiologists
Johns Hopkins Bloomberg School of Public Health faculty
Harvard University alumni
University of Minnesota alumni
University of Zaragoza alumni